Séraphîta is a French novel by Honoré de Balzac with themes of androgyny. It was published in the Revue de Paris in 1834. In contrast with the realism of most of the author's best known works, the story delves into the fantastic and the supernatural to illustrate philosophical themes.

In a castle in Norway near the fjord Stromfjord, Séraphitüs, a strange and melancholic being, conceals a terrible secret. Séraphitüs loves Minna, and she returns this love, believing Séraphitüs to be a man. But Séraphitüs is also loved by Wilfrid, who considers Séraphitüs to be a woman (Séraphîta).

In reality, Séraphitüs-Séraphîta is a perfect androgyne, born to parents who by the doctrines of Emanuel Swedenborg have transcended their humanity, and Séraphitüs-Séraphîta is the perfect example of humanity.

Ruggero Leoncavallo wrote a symphonic poem based on the story.

An early drawing of Paul Gauguin's ceramic sculpture Oviri bears the inscription Et le monstre, entréignant sa créature, féconde de sa semence des flancs généreux pour engendrer Séraphitus-Séraphita ("And the monster, embracing its creation, filled her generous womb with seed and fathered Séraphitus-Séraphita"), referring to the novel.

From 2010 to 2014 Ouriel Zohar staged Seraphita, his adaptation of the novel starring Barbara Heman at the Théâtre de l'Île Saint-Louis in Paris, and then in several countries around the world.

References

Sources

External links 

Androgyny
Books of La Comédie humaine
Novels first published in serial form
Works originally published in Revue de Paris
1834 French novels
Novels set in Norway
French LGBT novels
Bisexuality-related fiction
Emanuel Swedenborg
Novels by Honoré de Balzac
French novels adapted into plays